Beke may refer to:

 Beke (surname), a surname
 Beke language, an Eastern Sudanic language of Darfur
 Beke people, the descendants of the early European settlers in the French Antilles
 Beke, Amasya, a village in the Amasya Province, Turkey
 Beke (Lippe), a river of North Rhine-Westphalia, Germany
 Beke (Warnow), a river of Mecklenburg-Vorpommern, Germany
 Béke, Hungarian name of Mierovo, a village and municipality in south-west Slovakia
 BEKE, Bantu Educational Kinema Experimentin the mid-1930s

See also
 Beek (disambiguation)
 Beki